Percy Whitton ISO (28 January 186114 March 1923) was a senior Australian public servant.  He was Comptroller-General of the Department of Trade and Customs between October 1922 and his death in March 1923.

Life and career
Whitton was born in Hobart, Tasmania on 28 January 1861.

In 1902, Whitton transferred to the Commonwealth Audit Office and worked under its first Auditor-General John William Israel.

In 1910 he was appointed Collector of Customs for Victoria, a job in which he stayed until 1917 when he became Chief Prices Commissioner under the War Precautions Act.

In October 1922 he took up the position of Comptroller-General of Customs.

On 14 March 1923, Whitton suffered a heart attack and died in his sleep at his home on Munro Street, Armadale in Melbourne.

Awards
Whitton was appointed a Companion of the Imperial Service Order in June 1918 whilst Commonwealth Collector of Customs in Victoria.

References

1861 births
1923 deaths
Australian public servants
Australian Companions of the Imperial Service Order
20th-century Australian public servants
People from Hobart